Đồng Lê is a township (thị trấn) in Tuyên Hóa District, Quảng Bình Province, Bắc Trung Bộ, Việt Nam. This is the seat of district government. This township is the commercial centre of the surrounding rural area. Most Nguồn speakers in Vietnam live in the secluded Minh Hóa district of Quảng Bình Province, with others in the area around Đồng Lê.

Communes of Quảng Bình province
Populated places in Quảng Bình province
District capitals in Vietnam
Townships in Vietnam